Nogent-le-Rotrou is a commune in the Eure-et-Loir department in northern France.

It is a sub-prefecture and is located on the river Huisne, 56 kilometres west of Chartres on the RN23 and 150 kilometres south west of Paris, to which it is linked by both rail and motorway. It was the former capital of the Perche with the count living in the impressive medieval Château Saint-Jean which still dominates the town from a plateau of the same name.

Economy
The town lies within the Perche at the heart of a vast agricultural zone. Many jobs were therefore tied to agriculture, but the numbers declined sharply from the late 1970s with up to 5% of jobs being shed each year. Industrial employment owed much to the automotive sector which counted for almost 10% of jobs in the 1980s and 1990s and these were heavily linked to components manufacturer, Valeo. The company had a local workforce of over 1000 in 1999, but this too has been in decline as Valeo has delocalised to follow clients such as Renault to Romania. The headcount had fallen to 800 by April 2007, when Valeo announced that would be cutting a further 260 jobs between July 2007 and December 2009. All is not doom and gloom, however, as the German medical and pharmaceutical supplier, B. Braun Melsungen announced in early 2009 that it would be investing 20 million euros to modernise its local plant for it to specialise in the production of infusion pumps used in the intravenous administration of drugs. As a result, employment on the B. Braun site is to increase from 450 to 500.

There is also a large military presence, with the town being the base for one of France's three civil defense units. L'Unité d'instruction et d'intervention de la Sécurité civile n°1 (UIISC1) was created in 1978 and in 2001 there were 650 men at the base. They are used both at home and abroad, in all types of disaster situation.

The Nogent region counted 14,407 jobs in 1999, which were broken down as follows : Agriculture : 6.8% (France = 4.1), Industry : 32.5 (France = 18.4), Construction 5.5%, (France = 5.8) and Services = 55.2% (France = 71.7).

Population

Administration
The previous mayor was the centre-left François Huwart, who has held power between 1989 and 2020. He followed in the footsteps of his father, Robert Huwart, who was mayor from 1965 to 1987.

Prominent people connected to Nogent-le-Rotrou
 Clara Filleul (1822–1878), painter, children's writer
 Gustave Le Bon (born 1841), social psychologist, sociologist, anthropologist
 Yoann Kowal (born 1987), athlete
 Paul Tirard (born 1879), diplomat
 Maximilien de Béthune, Duke of Sully
 Mathilde Mauté, wife of the poet Paul Verlaine

See also
Communes of the Eure-et-Loir department
 Perche

References

External links

Communes of Eure-et-Loir
Subprefectures in France
Perche